Clifford Ian Simpson (born July 16, 1996), known by his stage name Kevin Abstract, is an American rapper, singer, and songwriter known for his role as a founding member of Brockhampton. He released his debut album, MTV1987, in 2014 to critical acclaim, and received attention from a number of major music blogs and magazine publications. His second album, American Boyfriend: A Suburban Love Story, was released in November 2016, and his third, Arizona Baby, was released in April 2019.

Early life 
Abstract was born in Corpus Christi, Texas. Abstract never met his father and was not close with his mother, not even knowing what her profession was. As Abstract began to realize his sexuality, he isolated himself from his family, feeling ashamed. Many speculate that this is one of the reasons that he ran away from home. He has stated that his family members are "extremely religious" Mormons. Abstract began producing music at 11 and ran away from home at 15, staying at a friend's house for a year before moving to Georgia to live with his sister.

Music career

2014: MTV1987 

At the beginning of 2014, Abstract began working on his debut album with his in-house record producer, Romil. On April 1, 2014, he released the record's first single, entitled "Save". The second single from the album, "Drugs", was released on May 6, 2014, with the music video following around a month later. The album was released on July 15, 2014, and was met with positive reviews from a number of music blogs, such as Billboard, Complex, Spin Pigeons & Planes, and 2DopeBoyz.

After the release of MTV1987, Abstract began working on the music video for the song "Hell/Heroina," using more than $3,000 accrued from fans through a Kickstarter campaign. The crowdfunded project was directed by Tyler Mitchell and finally released on November 4, 2014. Abstract also did a 24-hour live stream on November 1, leading up to the video release, where viewers watched both himself and his computer screen as the audience listened to him talk, observed him interact with him on Twitter, and watched movies together.  As of November 2018, it has been removed from most major download and streaming services.

2015: Death of a Supermodel and NOWIFIII 
On January 15, 2015, Abstract informed fans via his Twitter page that his second record was to be titled Death of a Supermodel and that it would be released later in the year. However, this album was later discarded. Abstract has announced that he is now working on a different album, They Shoot Horses, a part of the Death of a Supermodel trilogy.

On May 30, Abstract and other BROCKHAMPTON members, bearface., Romil Hemnani & Henock Sileshi released a side project EP titled "MEMORIAL DAY" under new personas and the "NOWIFIII" name due to the 2015 Texas floods making them lose their Wi-Fi.

On June 23, Abstract released a video for "Save", directed by Ian Gilner, Henock Sileshi, & Franklin Mendez. In November, the first single from They Shoot Horses, "Echo" was released, along with a music video directed by Tyler Mitchell.

2016–2017: American Boyfriend: A Suburban Love Story and Viceland 

In March 2016, Abstract joined alternative band The Neighbourhood on a week-long tour through England, opening up shows in Portsmouth, Birmingham, Manchester, and London. The final show of the tour was live streamed via the Periscope app, in which he also teased his new album They Shoot Horses, expected to be released in 2016. He also provided confirmation that his next single would be called Empty.

In April, Abstract announced that he would be going on tour with The Neighbourhood again, but this time in the US, during May and June. Abstract exclusively performed new songs from his upcoming album.

At the end of June, Abstract announced that he had changed the title of his upcoming album to American Boyfriend: A Suburban Love Story and reassured fans that it would still be coming later that year.

Abstract, along with fellow members of Brockhampton, appeared in the Viceland television series American Boyband, which premiered on June 8, 2017. The series followed Abstract on his first headlining tour across North America, while also capturing moments of other Brockhampton members still at home in South Central, Los Angeles.

Abstract is currently managed by longtime manager & business partner Anish Ochani and Christian & Kelly Clancy of 4 Strikes.

Brockhampton 

Near the end of 2014,  AliveSinceForever disbanded. Out of that project, the musical group Brockhampton was formed by Abstract and others he met on the Kanye West fan forum KanyeToThe.

In January 2015, Brockhampton's debut single "Bet I" was released. The video for the song was released on March 25, 2015, and was directed by fellow Brockhampton members HK Covers and Franklin Mendez.

On June 16, Brockhampton released a second single "Hero". At the end of June, it was announced that Brockhampton had won VFiles Loud, an online talent contest aiming to discover the best up-and-coming collectives. Brockhampton was given the opportunity to premiere a professionally directed music video for their third single on MTV, as well as having it released through the independent recording label Fool's Gold Records. The single, "Dirt", was premiered through Apple's Beats 1 Radio and was released on iTunes a few days after.

On March 30, Brockhampton released their first collective mixtape: All-American Trash. On April 22, they also released a documentary showcasing the making of the project.

In 2017, Brockhampton released two albums (Saturation and Saturation II) in the summer of 2017, both to widespread critical acclaim. Three days before the release of Saturation II, Abstract announced via Twitter that a third album titled Saturation III would also be released, marking Brockhampton's third full studio album of the calendar year. Saturation III was released December 15, which also received critical acclaim. Although it was stated by the group that Saturation III would be their final studio album, Brockhampton announced that their fourth studio album, Team Effort, was expected to be released in 2018. However, Team Effort was delayed indefinitely until 2018 following the group's decision to create another album, Puppy, to be released in its place, only for it to be delayed following the sexual assault allegations on fellow Brockhampton member Ameer Vann.

On September 21, 2018, Brockhampton released their fourth studio album, Iridescence, recorded at Abbey Road Studios in 10 days. They also released merchandise to promote both the upcoming album and their upcoming tour, named I'll be there. On August 23, 2019, their fifth studio album, Ginger, was released to an overall positive reception.

2018-2019: Arizona Baby 

In June 2018, Abstract added a picture with the text "ambfII" to his Instagram story, with "ambfII" presumably standing for American Boyfriend II. Later that year, in October, he tweeted the words "american boyfriend", seemingly teasing something. On March 19, 2019, Abstract tweeted a photo, which appears to be the cover of a new album or a single. He also changed his profile picture and his header image. In early April, he expressed in a series of now deleted tweets that once he released as much music as he can in 2019, he would like to retire and focus on filmmaking. Throughout the following weeks, Abstract released more teasers for his upcoming third studio album, Arizona Baby. With the album to be released in three separate parts, Abstract released a new single titled "Big Wheels" on April 9, 2019, with the first part of Arizona Baby releasing just two days later on April 11, along with a music video for "Georgia". On the same day, Abstract announced the second part to the Arizona Baby album, Ghettobaby, released April 18, with a music video for "Baby Boy". Finally, the full album was released on April 25, alongside a music video for the song "Peach".

2020-present: KA3* 

On January 18, 2021, Abstract teased a song titled "It's Alright". He later teased another song called "Sierra Nights" on February 6, 2021. He would go on to preview the tracks in full in an Instagram stream, and played snippets of 3 other songs on February 23, 2021.

On May 16, 2021, Abstract posted snippets of 2 songs, "Tucker" and "Seven Days a Week", the latter being worked on with Brockhampton member HK. On May 22, he shared a snippet for "4Sure". On May 24, Abstract posted a picture of him and a text saying "1978". He teased the track "Everything" the following day. A different version of "Everything", with pitched up vocals and drums, was teased on June 4, 2021.

On July 16, 2021, Abstract released a single titled, "Slugger", featuring $NOT and slowthai. On August 18, 2021, he released the single, "Sierra Nights", alongside Ryan Beatty.

Other ventures 
In 2021, Abstract started the clothing brand Video Store Apparel (VSA) with fellow Brockhampton member Romil Hemnani. Stylist Nick Holiday is a frequent collaborator.

Abstract also became a creative consultant in the second season of the HBO teen drama, Euphoria.

Influences 
Abstract said his influences for MTV1987 were Frank Ocean, Justin Timberlake, and Kid Cudi. Abstract has described Kanye West, Pink Floyd, Radiohead, Childish Gambino, Outkast, Lana Del Rey and Tyler, the Creator as influences on his music, with Tyler's group, Odd Future, being a large point of reference and inspiration for Brockhampton.

Personal life 
Abstract came out as gay in 2016 and his records often mention his sexuality. He has stated he will rap about being gay as long as he can imagine a fan in need of a voice. As of 2022, Abstract is dating Brockhampton collaborator and stylist Nick Holiday.

Selected discography

Studio albums

With Brockhampton 

 All-American Trash (2016)
 Saturation (2017)
 Saturation II (2017)
 Saturation III (2017)
 Iridescence (2018)
 Ginger (2019)
Roadrunner: New Light, New Machine (2021)
The Family (2022)
 TM (2022)

Singles

Filmography

Music videos

Notes

References

External links 
 

1996 births
Living people
21st-century African-American male singers
21st-century American LGBT people
African-American male rappers
African-American male singer-songwriters
Alternative hip hop musicians
Alternative R&B musicians
American alternative rock musicians
American bandleaders
Alternative rock singers
American gay musicians
Brockhampton (band) members
Dream pop musicians
LGBT African Americans
LGBT people from Georgia (U.S. state)
LGBT people from Texas
LGBT rappers
American LGBT singers
People from Corpus Christi, Texas
Rappers from Texas
Singer-songwriters from Georgia (U.S. state)
Singer-songwriters from Texas